Confederation High School was an Ottawa area high school from 1967 to 1999. The building is still owned by the Ottawa-Carleton District School Board and is used for offices, community events, and sports.

History
The school was a Carleton Board of Education facility that covered the southern portion of Nepean. This included the community of Barrhaven across the Greenbelt from the school. Barrhaven grew rapidly and eventually the majority of Confederation's students were coming from that area. It was decided that a new high school, John McCrae Secondary School, would be built in Barrhaven. Confederation was closed in 1999.

References

Defunct schools in Ottawa
Educational institutions established in 1967
Educational institutions disestablished in 1999
1967 establishments in Ontario
1999 disestablishments in Ontario